Dead Meat: 10 Years of Blood, Feathers & Lipstick is a box set and 2nd compilation album by horror punk musician Wednesday 13. It's a collection that spans his solo career from 2003-2013 and other projects he fronted such as Murderdolls and Frankenstein Drag Queens From Planet 13 It features 4 discs. A best of compilation, a collection of demos and the entire Re-Animated EP with extra remixes.

Background
The album was released by Wednesday on July 8, 2014, to celebrate 10 years as a solo musician. It was released on the same day as his Acoustic album Undead Unplugged.

Track listing

Personnel
All musicians that appear on the album
 Wednesday 13 - Composer, Instrumentation, Liner Notes, Lyricist, Primary Artist, Vocals
 Jonny Chops - drums
 Troy Doebbler - bass, background vocals
 Jamie Hoover - piano, slide guitars
 Nate Manor - bass
 Racci Shay - drums
 Roman Surman - guitar, background vocals
 Jack Tankersley - guitar, background vocals
 Jason Trioxin - guitar
 Jason "Shakes" West - drums

Additional Personnel
 Brent Clawson - Editing, Mastering
 Laume Conroy - Cover Art
 Koichi Fukuda - Remixing
 Ross Smith - Remixing
 Marlene Velasco - Design, Layout

References

Wednesday 13 albums
2014 compilation albums
Horror punk compilation albums